These are the official results of the 2012 Ibero-American Championships in Athletics which took place on June 8–10, 2012 in Barquisimeto, Venezuela.

Men's results

100 meters

Heats – June 8Wind:Heat 1: -0.0 m/s, Heat 2: -1.1 m/s, Heat 3: -0.2 m/s

Final – June 8Wind:-0.2 m/s

200 meters

Heats – June 9Wind:Heat 1: -1.0 m/s, Heat 2: -1.4 m/s, Heat 3: +2.5 m/s

Final – June 9Wind:-0.9 m/s

400 meters

Heats – June 8

Final – June 8

800 meters
June 9

1500 meters
June 10

3000 meters
June 9

5000 meters
June 9

110 meters hurdles

Heats – June 9Wind:Heat 1:-4.8 m/s, Heat 2: -2.2 m/s

Final – June 9Wind:+1.0 m/s

400 meters hurdles

Heats – June 8

Final – June 8

3000 meters steeplechase
June 8

4 x 100 meters relay
June 10

4 x 400 meters relay
June 10

20,000 meters walk
June 10

High jump
June 8

Pole vault
June 9

Long jump
June 8

Triple jump
June 9

Shot put
June 9

Discus throw
June 8

Hammer throw
June 9

Javelin throw
June 9

Decathlon
June 8–9

Women's results

100 meters

Heats – June 8Wind:Heat 1: -4.2 m/s, Heat 2: +2.5 m/s, Heat 3: +0.1 m/s

Final – June 8Wind:-0.6 m/s

200 meters

Heats – June 9Wind:Heat 1: -4.2 m/s, Heat 2: +2.5 m/s, Heat 3: +0.1 m/s

Final – June 9Wind:-0.6 m/s

400 meters

Heats – June 8

Final – June 8

800 meters

Heats – June 9

Final – June 9

1500 meters
June 10

3000 meters
June 8

5000 meters
June 9

100 meters hurdles

Heats – June 9Wind:Heat 1: -0.3 m/s, Heat 2: -0.4 m/s

Final – June 9Wind:+0.4 m/s

400 meters hurdles
June 8

3000 meters steeplechase
June 8

4 x 100 meters relay
June 10

4 x 400 meters relay
June 10

10,000 meters walk
June 10

High jump
June 8

Pole vault
June 10

Long jump
June 10

Triple jump
June 9

Shot put
June 9

Discus throw
June 10

Hammer throw
June 8

Javelin throw
June 8

Heptathlon
June 9–10

References
Official results

Ibero-American Championships Results
Events at the Ibero-American Championships in Athletics